Oxborough v North Harbour Builders Ltd is a cited case in New Zealand regarding repudiation.

Background
In 1999, the Oxborough's entered into a contract with a builder to build them a house, with construction to start in March, and to be completed by July.

However, early on in the build, the Oxboroughs complained about some of the workmanship, resulting in the builders in May to start remedial work to the house.

In August, the Oxboroughs informed the builders that they were cancelling the contract, claiming that the builder was repudiating the contract, and demanding that the builder to remove the nearly completed house and to refund all the money they had previously paid the builder.

Held
The evidence did not prove that the builders did not intend to complete the contract.

References

New Zealand contract case law
High Court of New Zealand cases
2001 in New Zealand law
2001 in case law